The 1933 All-Ireland Senior Camogie Championship was the high point of the 1933 season in Camogie. The championship was won by Dublin, who defeated Galway by a 17-point margin in the final. The match was played at Killester.

Structure
The championship was entered by 16 counties, up from 10 in 1932. Kildare qualified for the semi-final for the only time in their history, but found themselves 3–0 to nil down at half time and scoring a late goal through Polly Smith of Newbridge St Theresa's. The decision to name the inter-county cup the O'Duffy Cup after Sean O'Duffy was made at a Central Council meeting on August 19, 1933.

Final
Dillon Bowden scored the first point in the final as Ita McNeill and Jean Hannon shared seven goals between them in the Dublin attack. The Dublin midfield trio of Mollie Gill, Máire O'Kelly and Emmy Delaney dictated the final. Galway stayed in the match until half-time but were swept away in the second period. Monica Duggan, sister of hurling star, Jimmy Duggan played for Galway in the final.

Championship Results

First round

Final stages

 
 Match Rules
40 minutes
Replay if scores level
No substitutions except in case of injury

See also
 All-Ireland Senior Hurling Championship
 Wikipedia List of Camogie players
 National Camogie League
 Camogie All Stars Awards
 Ashbourne Cup

References

External links
 Camogie Association
 Historical reports of All Ireland finals
 All-Ireland Senior Camogie Championship: Roll of Honour
 Camogie on facebook
 Camogie on GAA Oral History Project

1933 in camogie
1933
1933 in Gaelic games